Mark Waddington (born 4 June 1989 in Keighley, West Yorkshire, England), is a British comedy magician who currently resides in Skipton, North Yorkshire, England. Mark was voted "Best in the UK" for 2008. Mark specialises in close up magic, and primarily performs at weddings and corporate events in the UK and across Europe.

Career
Mark has worked as a comedy magician since the age of 12 when he made his professional debut at The City Varieties Music Hall in Leeds. He performs internationally as a close up magician, and is a regular feature on the corporate entertainment scene.

Mark has performed alongside many well-known names, including supporting Channel 4 magician Paul Zenon during his Stand-up show, as well as performing his own comedy magic act with Jimmy Cricket, Johnnie Casson, Bobby Knutt, Gorden Kaye, and others. Mark has appeared in the media many times and TV appearances include Channel 4, ITV and BBC. He has also made many appearances on the radio as a magician, including Fresh Radio, BCB Radio, BBC Radio Leeds, BBC Radio York, BBC Radio Sheffield and BBC Radio 1.

Mark also works as a specialised magic consultant for TV production. Notably Mark has acted as a magic consultant for ITV's Emmerdale, assisting recurring character Rodney to perform magic within the soap.

Mark is regularly called upon as an expert for Radio broadcasts. Notably Mark has been brought in as a magic expert for BBC Radio 5 Live, and is often heard on BBC Radio York as a talking head discussing a wide range of subjects on the Beth McCarthy show, from entertainment, to single parenthood, and many other subjects.

Awards
Mark was crowned the First Place winner of Starnow UK talent search in [2008].

Mark became a member of The Magic Circle in May 2009, and was awarded the MMC membership level.

In April 2019, Mark's membership to The Magic Circle was reviewed, and he was unanimously promoted to an Associate of the Inner Magic Circle (AIMC), and was also additionally awarded the silver star for exceptional performance abilities. Mark is one of less than 350 magicians in the world to be awarded such a title.

Mark has been awarded the ‘Best Entertainment’ at the North of England Wedding Awards, in 2014, 2016 and 2017.

References

External links
 Mark Waddington Website

English magicians
People from Skipton
Living people
1989 births